Saints Centola and Helen were, according to Christian tradition, two women who were martyred at Burgos in 304 AD during the persecution of Christians by Diocletian.

Veneration
Their cult remained localized in the Burgos region.  A late Visigothic hermitage dedicated to the two saints can be found at Valdelateja, and there is a church dedicated to them at Villafranca Montes de Oca by Rodrigo de la Haya.

References

External links
 CatholicSaints

4th-century Christian martyrs
Saints from Hispania